Hugo José Jorge O'Neill (7 June 1874 in Lisbon, Santos-o-Velho – 30 March 1940 in Palmela) was the head of the Clanaboy O'Neill dynasty, whose family has been in Portugal since the 18th century.

Recognition
He was the first son of the previous head of the family of Jorge Torlades O'Neill II and wife Maria Isabel Mazziotti da Costa Cordeiro Fernandes. He was also the Representative of the title of Viscount of Santa Mónica, in Portugal.

Life
Hugo José Jorge O'Neill was an Officer of the Portuguese Navy and an Officer at the Orders of Kings Carlos I of Portugal and Manuel II of Portugal. He met and corresponded with Roger Casement in 1904 (when Casement was briefly consul general in Lisbon) and the also met with the Belfast antiquarian solicitor Francis Joseph Bigger. O'Neill also employed an Irish governess for his children.

Marriage and issue
He married in Lisbon, Santos-o-Velho, on 14 February 1906 Dona Júlia Margarida Catarina de Serpa Pimentel de Sousa Coutinho (Lisbon, Lapa, 27 September 1881 – Lisbon, Pena, 28 February 1934), daughter of Dom Fernando de Serpa Leitão de Mansilha Pimentel and wife Dona Maria Ana Vitória de Sousa Coutinho, and had four children: 
 Maria Ana do Carmo O'Neill (Cascais, 30 July 1907 – ?), married Lisbon, Encarnação, 3 January 1929 her co-brother-in-law Dr. Dom João José de Melo (Cascais, 9 September 1904 – ?), son of Dom António Vasco de Melo da Silva César de Menezes, 10th Count of Sabugosa and 12th Count of São Lourenço and representative of the title of Marquess of Sabugosa, and wife Berta Munró dos Anjos, and had three children
 Jorge Maria O'Neill (Lisbon, Encarnação, 7 November 1908 – Lisbon, 15 December 1988)
 Maria Isabel de Jesus O'Neill (Lisbon, Encarnação, 27 May 1910 – ?), married Lisbon, Encarnação, 11 April 1929 her co-brother-in-law Dom António Vasco José de Melo da Silva César de Menezes, 4th Marquess and 11th Count of Sabugosa and 13th Count of São Lourenço (Cascais, 28 September 1903 – ?), son of Dom António Vasco de Melo da Silva César de Menezes, 10th Count of Sabugosa and 12th Count of São Lourenço and representative of the title of Marquess of Sabugosa, and wife Berta Munró dos Anjos, and had five children
 Fernando Hugo Maria O'Neill (Lisbon, Encarnação, 13 October 1914 – Setúbal, 17 October 1974), Civil Engineer from the Instituto Superior Técnico of the University of Lisbon, married Lisbon, Santos-o-Velho, 6 October 1947 Maria Lívia Rita da Graça de Sá Pais do Amaral Franco (born Lisbon, Santos-o-Velho, 19 March 1923), daughter of Dr. Frederico Gaspar Schindler Franco Castelo-Branco and wife Maria Rita de Sá Pais do Amaral, and had four children: 
 Rita Maria Franco O'Neill (born Lisbon, Encarnação, 9 January 1950 – Madrid, 9 October 1977), After receiving a diploma from the Instituto Superior de Línguas e Administração of the University of Lisbon, married Lisbon, Prazeres, 27 March 1971 Dom Sebastião Maria de Sá Coutinho de Lancastre (born Lisbon, 13 June 1945), son of Dom Sebastião de Oliveira e Almeida Calheiros de Lancastre and wife Maria Angelina de Sá Coutinho Rebelo Sotomaior, without issue
 João Hugo Maria Franco O'Neill (born Lisbon, Encarnação, 2 April 1951), Agricultural Engineer by the Instituto Superior de Agronomia, married Oeiras, Caxias, 29 September 1975 Maria da Graça de Castelo-Branco Schedel (born Lisbon, São Sebastião da Pedreira, 15 August 1952), daughter of João Ferrão de Castelo-Branco Schedel and wife Dona Maria Isabel da Visitação de Siqueira de Castelo-Branco, and had two children: 
 Vera Schedel O'Neill (born Lisbon, Alvalade, 21 March 1976), married Lisbon, Prazeres, 13 December 1997 Manuel de Atouguia Belford Correia da Silva (born Angola, 16 July 1973), son of Pedro de Barros Belford Correia da Silva and first wife (as her first husband and divorced) Margarida Maria de Castro de Atouguia, and had one son
 Duarte Schedel O'Neill (born Lisbon, Alvalade, 7 May 1979), Licentiate in Journalism from the Faculty of Letters of the University of Lisbon
 Maria Ana Franco O'Neill (born Lisbon, Encarnação, 26 June 1952), Licentiate in Mathematics from the University of Lisbon, married Lisbon, Prazeres, 26 October 1973 as his first wife Dr. Dom Manuel José de Gouveia Portela de Herédia (born Lisbon, Campo Grande, 3 July 1948), Licentiate in Law from the University of Lisbon, Lawyer, son of Dom José de Freitas Branco de Herédia and first wife (divorced) Maria do Carmo de Gouveia Portela, and had three children
 José Maria Franco O'Neill (born Lisbon, Santos-o-Velho, 2 July 1954), Licentiate in Organization and Managing of Businesses from the Instituto Superior de Ciências do Trabalho e da Empresa of the University of Lisbon, married Lisbon, Prazeres, 3 March 1990 Cecília Maria de Bragança Mendes (born Lisbon, São Domingos de Benfica, 16 September 1967), daughter of Dr. José dos Reis Mendes, Licentiate in Medicine from the Faculty of Medicine of the University of Coimbra, and wife Dona Leonor de Bragança, and had two children: 
 Rodrigo Maria de Bragança Mendes O'Neill (born Lisbon, Prazeres, 17 February 1993)
 Rita Maria dos Reis de Bragança Mendes O'Neill (born Lisbon, Prazeres, 5 January 1996)

See also
 Irish nobility
 Irish kings
 Irish royal families
 O'Neill (surname)
 Uí Néill, the Irish Dynasty
 Ó Neill Dynasty Today
 O'Neill of Clannaboy

Notes

References

External links
 Hugo José Jorge O'Neill's Genealogy in a Portuguese Genealogical site
 

1874 births
1940 deaths
Irish lords
Portuguese nobility
Portuguese people of Irish descent
Connachta
O'Neill dynasty
People from Lisbon